Zangvan Rural District is a rural district (dehestan) in Karezan District, Sirvan County, Ilam Province, Iran. At the 2006 census, its population was 3,679, in 764 families.  The rural district has 14 villages.

References 

Rural Districts of Ilam Province
Sirvan County